Jordan Ifeanyi Nwora (born September 9, 1998) is a Nigerian-American professional basketball player for the Indiana Pacers of the National Basketball Association (NBA). He played college basketball for the Louisville Cardinals. He plays internationally for the Nigeria men's national basketball team.

Early life
Nwora was born on September 9, 1998, in Buffalo, New York to a Nigerian father and an American mother. His father Alexander Nwora, a basketball coach, helped Jordan in developing his basketball abilities.

High school career
Nwora started playing basketball at Amherst Central High School in the 2013–2014 season, before transferring to The Park School of Buffalo for two seasons. At The Park School he shot 42 percent from three-point range leading the Pioneers to the New York State Federation Class B championship, averaging 21.5 points, 6.5 rebounds, 2.4 steals, and 1.4 assists. His second season at The Park School saw him raise all of his season averages, turning in 23.4 points, 10.1 rebounds, 2.3 steals, and 1.8 assists. He earned First Team All-Centercourt honors in both his junior and senior seasons playing at The Park School. 
Nwora continued his prep career for one more season, where he scored over 500 points at Vermont Academy, averaging 18.7 points and 5.3 rebounds in the 2016–2017 season.

College career
Nwora joined the Louisville Cardinals in 2018. In his freshman season, he averaged 5.7 points, 2.2 rebounds and 0.4 assists per game.

During his sophomore season, Nwora became a permanent starter on the team six games into the season.
He averaged 17.0 points, 7.6 rebounds, and 1.3 assists per game, becoming the second Most Improved Player in the NCAA and named Most Improved Player in the ACC.

He was named the preseason ACC player of the year. On January 29, 2020, Nwora scored a career-high 37 points and added nine rebounds in a 86–69 win against Boston College. At the conclusion of the regular season, Nwora was named to the First Team All-ACC, finishing second in the player of the year voting to Tre Jones. As a junior, Nwora averaged 18 points and 7.7 rebounds per game while shooting 44% from the field. Following the season, he declared for the 2020 NBA draft.

Professional career

Milwaukee Bucks (2020–2023)
Nwora was selected with the 45th overall pick by the Milwaukee Bucks in the 2020 NBA draft. On November 24, 2020, the Bucks announced that they had signed Nwora. He was assigned to the Salt Lake City Stars for the start of the NBA G League season, making his debut on February 10, 2021. Three days later, he was recalled from the Stars because of an ankle injury. On May 16, Nwora scored a career–high 34 points during a 118–112 loss to the Chicago Bulls. Nwora was part of the Bucks team that won the 2021 NBA Finals. On December 18, 2021, Nwora scored a season-high 28 points, along with 11 rebounds, in a 119–90 loss to the Cleveland Cavaliers.

Indiana Pacers (2023–present) 
On February 9, 2023, Nwora was traded to the Indiana Pacers in a four-team trade involving the Brooklyn Nets and Phoenix Suns. He made his Pacers debut on February 13, recording seven points, three rebounds and two steals in a 123–117 loss to the Utah Jazz.

National team career
Nwora was called up to be part of the D'Tigers for the 2019 FIBA world cup qualifier between June 28–30, 2018, by his father Alexander Nwora who is the head coach of the team. In the tournament, he averaged 21.7 points, 8 rebounds and 2.7 assists. During the 2019 FIBA World Cup qualifiers in Lagos, Nwora scored 36 points against Mali to be the highest scoring player for Nigeria in history, breaking Ike Diogu's record of 31 points.

Nwora scored a game-high 33 points in a loss to Germany in the preliminary round of the 2020 Olympics in Tokyo. He led Nigeria in scoring in the tournament after averaging 21 points per game.

Career statistics

NBA

Regular season

|-
| style="text-align:left;background:#afe6ba;"|†
| align="left" | Milwaukee
| 30 || 2 || 9.1 || .459 || .452 || .760 || 2.0 || .2 || .5 || .2 || 5.7
|-
| style="text-align:left;"|
| align="left" | Milwaukee
| 62 || 13 || 19.1 || .403 || .348 || .837 || 3.6 || 1.0 || .4 || .3 || 7.9
|-
| style="text-align:left;"|
| align="left" | Milwaukee
| 38 || 3 || 15.7 || .386 || .392 || .860 || 3.1 || 1.0 || .3 || .2 || 6.0
|- class="sortbottom"
| style="text-align:center;" colspan="2"| Career
| 130 || 18 || 15.8 || .408 || .376 || .829 || 3.1 || .8 || .4 || .2 || 6.8

Playoffs

|-
| style="text-align:left;background:#afe6ba;"| 2021†
| style="text-align:left;"| Milwaukee
| 5 || 0 || 6.2 || .222 || .250 || .714 || 1.8 || .2 || .0 || .2 || 3.0
|-
| style="text-align:left;"| 2022
| style="text-align:left;"| Milwaukee
| 8 || 0 || 2.5 || .222 || .000 || .000 || .4 || .3 || .0 || .0 || .5
|- class="sortbottom"
| style="text-align:center;" colspan="2"|Career
| 13 || 0 || 3.9 || .222 || .167 || .556 || .9 || .2 || .0 || .1 || 1.5

College

|-
| style="text-align:left;"| 2017–18
| style="text-align:left;"| Louisville
| 28 || 0 || 12.0 || .464 || .439 || .769 || 2.2 || .4 || .6 || .1 || 5.7
|-
| style="text-align:left;"| 2018–19
| style="text-align:left;"| Louisville
| 34 || 29 || 31.9 || .446 || .374 || .765 || 7.6 || 1.3 || .9 || .4 || 17.0
|-
| style="text-align:left;"| 2019–20
| style="text-align:left;"| Louisville
| 31 || 30 || 33.1 || .440 || .402 || .813 || 7.7 || 1.3 || .7 || .3 || 18.0
|- class="sortbottom"
| style="text-align:center;" colspan="2"| Career
| 93 || 59 || 26.3 || .445 || .394 || .785 || 6.0 || 1.0 || .8 || .2 || 13.9

Personal life
Jordan Nwora is the first son of Amy Nwora, an American and Alexander Nwora the Erie Community College and Nigerian National Basketball Team Head Coach His 3 siblings (Ronni, Caeli, and Lex) are also interested in basketball as his sister Ronni Nwora played high school basketball for The Park School of Buffalo, Buffalo, New York. She currently plays for the Georgia Tech Yellow Jackets women's basketball team.

During the 2019 FIBA World Cup qualifier in Lagos, Jordan and his father Alexander became the first Nigerian Son and Father to represent a Nigerian national team side at the same time.

References

External links
Louisville Cardinals bio

1998 births
Living people
21st-century African-American sportspeople
2019 FIBA Basketball World Cup players
African-American basketball players
All-American college men's basketball players
American men's basketball players
American sportspeople of Nigerian descent
Amherst Central High School Alumni
Basketball players at the 2020 Summer Olympics
Basketball players from Buffalo, New York
Louisville Cardinals men's basketball players
Milwaukee Bucks draft picks
Milwaukee Bucks players
National Basketball Association players from Nigeria
Nigerian men's basketball players
Olympic basketball players of Nigeria
Salt Lake City Stars players
Small forwards
Vermont Academy alumni
Wisconsin Herd players